Joy Mukherjee (24 February 1939 – 9 March 2012) was an Indian actor and director. He was titled as the 'heart throb of the 1960s and 1970s'.

Family background

Joy Mukherjee was the son of Sashadhar Mukherjee and Sati Devi. His father was a successful producer and a co-founder of Filmalaya Studios. His uncles were director Subodh Mukherjee, Ashok Kumar, Anoop Kumar and Kishore Kumar. Joy Mukherjee was educated in Col. Brown Cambridge School in Dehra Dun and St. Xavier College. His wife's name is Neelam and they had two sons Monjoy (also known as Toy), Sujoy (also known as Boy) and a daughter Simran.

Career
Joy debuted opposite Sadhana in the film Love in Simla (1960), directed by R. K. Nayyar. He then starred with Asha Parekh for several hits like Phir Wohi Dil Laya Hoon, Love in Tokyo, Ziddi and Hum Hindustani. Some of his films like Aao Pyar Karen and Shagird (opposite Saira Bano), Ek Musafir Ek Haseena with Sadhna, Ishaara with Vyjayantimala and Jee Chahta Hai with Rajashree were superhit movies. Most of his movies had hit music. By the late 1960s, acting roles began drying up, so he began directing and producing.

He produced and directed Humsaya although this films did not do well. Despite a late success with home production Ek Baar Muskura Do (1972) with brother Deb Mukherjee and later to be sister-in-law Tanuja, Joy faded from the silver screen.

He later directed Rajesh Khanna in Chailla Babu in 1977 which was a major box office success. This film's success solved his insolvency problems which arose due to production of Love In Bombay. Later in 1985, Rajesh Khanna even gave him opportunity as a villain in the film Insaaf Main Karoonga, which became the last successful film of actor Joy Mukherjee.

Financial troubles 
Love in Bombay brought deep financial troubles for Joy Mukherjee but late director-actor's wife Neelam, who is releasing the movie 40 years later, says that despite losing everything, the film remained very close to him. "This film was my husband's Waterloo. He lost everything he had in this film. He sunk in lot of his own money, major properties. There were 37 cases of insolvency against him. But he cleared everything and had a clean slate and started afresh. This film was very dear to him despite it bringing so much problems to him," Mrs Mukherjee said. The 1973 film,  was the third part of the "Love in" series which started with Joy debuting with the blockbuster hit Love in Simla in 1960 and the golden jubilee hit Love in Tokyo in 1966. His insolvency issues got resolved when he directed his sole successful directorial venture Chailla Babu in 1977.

Death

Joy Mukherjee died on 9 March 2012 in Mumbai's Leelavati Hospital, exactly two weeks after his 73rd birthday, where he had been on a ventilator. He had a prolonged illness.

Filmography

See also
Pramod Chakravorty

References

External links
 
 Sixties star Joy Mukherjee passes away, Avijit Ghosh
 

Indian male film actors
Film directors from Mumbai
Film producers from Mumbai
People from Jhansi
Bengali male actors
1939 births
2012 deaths
20th-century Indian male actors
Male actors in Hindi cinema